Speed skating has been featured as a sport in the Winter Olympics since the first winter games in 1924. Women's events were added to the Olympic program for the first time in 1960 Squaw Valley Olympics.

Summary

History
The governing body for speed skating, the International Skating Union (ISU), was included in the list of recognized federations when the International Olympic Committee was founded, but was first discussed seriously for the 1908 Summer Olympics in London. No speed skating events were contested, although figure skating – also governed by the ISU – was on the programme. The preliminary calendar for the 1916 Summer Olympics, to be held in Berlin, listed a 3-event allround competition, but these Games were cancelled because of World War I.

The International Winter Sports Week in Chamonix, retro-actively dubbed the 1924 Winter Olympics, contained five speed skating events. Uncommon for the time, it not only included an all-round competition, but also awarded medals for the individual distances: 500 m, 1500 m, 5000 m and 10000 m. The all-round event was dropped before the 1928 Games, even though it remained the only World Championship format in the sport until the 1970s; single distance World Championships were not established until 1996.

The 1932 speed skating events were held according to the North American rules, meaning the skaters competed in small packs of skaters (the format paved the way for the development of short track speed skating), instead of the common against-the-clock format. These Games in Lake Placid, New York also saw the first female speed skaters at the Olympics in a set of demonstration events, with all victories being achieved by North American athletes. Women's events were also set to be held at the 1940 Winter Olympics, which were cancelled. After the war, they were withdrawn again by the decision of the IOC until the 1960 Olympics in Squaw Valley, when the women skated 500 m, 1000 m, 1500 m and 3000 m.

Following the introduction of World Sprint Championships in the early 1970s, the 1000 m for men was added in Innsbruck 1976, while the women's 5000 m, reinstated by the ISU as an official distance in 1981, made its Olympic debut in 1988. The latest addition to the Olympic speed skating programme is the team pursuit, which was added for the 2006 Turin Games. Its inclusion was remarkable as it had not yet been contested at a senior World Championship in the form skated at the Olympics at the time of inclusion. It had however been contested at a senior World Championship, the Dutch team won the 2005 title in Inzell, but in that form they only had to skate once and be the fastest, while the Olympic form required three starts.

At the 2010 Winter Olympics, Haralds Silovs became the first athlete in Olympic history to participate in both short track (1500m) and long track (5000m) speed skating, and the first to compete in two different disciplines on the same day.

Events

Men's
The following table shows when events were contested at each Games. Women's events were demonstrated in 1932.

• = official event, (d) = demonstration event

Women's
• = official event, (d) = demonstration event

Medal table

Sources (after the 2022 Winter Olympics):
Accurate as of 2022 Winter Olympics.

Number of speed skaters by country

See also
Ice sledge speed racing at the Winter Paralympics
List of Olympic venues in speed skating
List of Olympic medalists in speed skating

References

Notes

Bibliography

 Kluge, Volker. Olympische Winterspiele: Die Chronik - Chamonix 1924 - Lillehammer 1994. Berlin, Germany: Sportverlag, 2nd revised and updated edition, 1994.

External links

Speed skating at olympic.org

Speed skating at the Winter Olympics
Sports at the Winter Olympics
Olympics
International speed skating competitions